Endpeace is a 1996 novel from Australian author Jon Cleary. It was the thirteenth book featuring Sydney detective Scobie Malone.

Plot
The book starts with Scovie attending a dinner party held by a publishing tycoon. During the night the tycoon is shot dead and Scobie has to find the killer.

Background
As part of his research for the novel, Cleary visited the offices of the Sydney Morning Herald. However, he denied the publishing family in the book was based on the Fairfaxes, who then owned the Herald.

Reception
Reviewer Stuart Coupe said that, "over recent years Cleary's books have varied in quality but this is a superior effort from an acknowledged master of the genre."

References

External links
Endpeace at AustLit (subscription required)

1996 Australian novels
Novels set in Sydney
HarperCollins books
William Morrow and Company books
Novels by Jon Cleary